Asfandyar Wali Khan (Urdu and Pashto: اسفندیار ولی خان; born 19 February 1949) is a Pakistani Pashtun politician who is the president of the Awami National Party (ANP). His father, Abdul Wali Khan, was the party's first president. He is the grandson of Abdul Ghaffar Khan, better known as Bacha Khan; Abdul Ghaffar was the founder of the non-violent political movement in NWFP , Khudai Khidmatgar ("Servants of the God") during British colonial rule in India and a companion of Mahatma Gandhi. Asfandyar's Granduncle Khan Abdul Jabbar Khan was the Indian National Congress's Chief Minister of the North West Frontier Province, during the waning days of the British Raj, and also the Chief Minister of the province during the early days of independent Pakistan. Asfandyar is the present president of the Awami National Party and has served as Member of Provincial Assembly of Khyber Pakhtunkhwa, Member of the National Assembly of Pakistan and senator in the Senate of Pakistan. Asfandyar Wali Khan got credit of provincial autonomy in Pakistan and the renaming of North West Frontier Province as Khyber Pukhtoonkhwa with support of coalition partner PPP during 18th amendment 2010.

Personal background 

Asfandyar Wali Khan was born in Charsadda, then a small village outside of Peshawar, Khyber Pakhtoonkhwa, Pakistan. He is the eldest son of Abdul Wali Khan and his first wife Taj Bibi. After the death of his mother in February 1949 his father married Nasim Wali Khan in 1954. Sangeen Wali Khan was his half brother and eldest son of Nasim Wali Khan.

Education 
Asfandyar Wali Khan completed his early education from Aitchison College, Lahore, High School from Islamia Collegiate School and his BA from Islamia College, Peshawar Pakhtoon Khwa University of Peshawar.

Political career 
Asfandyar Wali Khan joined the opposition to Ayub Khan as a student activist. In 1975, Asfandyar was accused of the murder of Hayat Sherpao, against whose leadership at NWFP Asfandyar had allegedly waged an armed campaign. He was imprisoned and tortured  by the government of Zulfiqar Ali Bhutto and convicted as part of the Hyderabad tribunal for 15 years. Released in 1978, he stayed away from electoral politics till 1990..

Asfandyar Wali Khan served as leader of the Pakhtun Student Federation prior to being elected to the provincial Assembly in the 1990 election, while in the 1993 election he was elected to Pakistan's National Assembly. A seat to which he was re-elected to the National Assembly in the 1997 election and served as Parliamentary leader of the ANP and Chairman of the standing committee on inter-provincial co-ordination.

In 1999, he was elected party president for the first time. He was defeated in the 2002 election, in what was a repeat of his father's defeat in 1990, when a tactical alliance was formed by all the anti-ANP groups against him. After his defeat he resigned as President of his party, only to be re-elected unopposed in the subsequent party election. In 2003 he was elected to the Senate for a 6-year term. He was re-elected to the National Assembly in the parliamentary elections that was held in February 2008, leading his party to power both provincially and nationally, the former for the first time since 1947 and the latter since 1997.

In September 2008, he was elected as Chairman of the standing committee on foreign Affairs.

In 2008 it was reported by Dawn that he made a secret visit to the United States in which he made high level contacts with the U.S Central Command.

Assassination attempt 
On 3 October 2008, he was targeted by a suicide bomber who attempted to kill him while he was greeting guests during Eid ul-Fitr. Shortly after the attack, Asfandyar Wali Khan left Charsadda in a helicopter sent by the Prime Minister.

References

External links 
Awami National Party
Awami National Party
Khan Abdul-Ghaffar Khan/Badshah Khan, Wali Khan, ANP
Interview with Asfandyar Wali Khan
Asfandyar Wali: Profile of Pakistan's Progressive Pashtun Politician By Hassan Abbas

1949 births
Living people
Aitchison College alumni
Awami National Party politicians
Asfandyar Wali
North-West Frontier Province MPAs 1990–1993
Pakistani MNAs 1993–1996
Pakistani MNAs 1997–1999
Pakistani prisoners and detainees
Pashtun nationalists
Pashtun people